Good is a play in two acts written by British playwright Cecil Philip Taylor. First published for Methuen Drama in 1982, it was originally commissioned by the Royal Shakespeare Company in 1981 and was subsequently seen all over the world. Good has been described as the definitive piece written about the Holocaust in the English-speaking theatre. Set in pre-war Germany, it shows how John Halder, a liberal-minded professor whose best friend is the Jewish Maurice, could not only be seduced into joining the Nazis, but step-by-rationalised-step end up embracing the Final Solution, justifying to his conscience the terrible actions involved.

Plot overview
John Halder is a Frankfurt literary professor and an example of the good man: he is apparently devoted to his wife and children and he does his best to look after his aged mother. He even tells his best friend, a Jewish psychiatrist, that the anti-Semitism of the National Socialists is "just a balloon they throw up in the air to distract the masses." But this is Germany in 1933, and men can change. Cecil P. Taylor, in tracing his hero's progress over eight years towards the upper echelons of the SS, plausibly explains the private flaws that lead to endorsement of public monstrosity. Beneath Halder's surface 'goodness' lies a chilling moral detachment: he can abandon his distracted wife for a devoted student, he has written a pro-euthanasia novel, he hears in his head a continuous musical score that helps blot out daily reality. Taylor's point is that Nazism preyed on individual character flaws and on a missing moral dimension in otherwise educated and intelligent people. At first Halder believes he can help 'push the Nazis towards humanity'. Slowly he succumbs to vanity, careerism and the desire for an easy life. Above all, he remains curiously detached from reality. At the end Halder not only becomes a member of the Nazi party but also plays a direct role in SS book burnings, in euthanasia experiments, in the night of the Broken Glass, and, finally, in Adolf Eichmann's genocide at Auschwitz, where Maurice, the sole source of a Jewish perspective in the play and original force of "good" in Halder, ends up being deported.

Themes
Good is a play about the causes rather than the consequences of Nazism, about morality and seduction. It explores how a "good" man gets caught up in the intricate web of personal and social reasons why the average person might be seduced in to what we see as abhorrent. The author thus rejects the view that the Nazi atrocities are explained as a result of the simple conspiracy of criminals and psychopaths. Furthermore, the lessons of Nazism and the play are not just about the revulsion resulting from six million dead but are also a warning about popular movements that lead to holocausts. Not judgmental of its protagonist, Good invites us to question just what a "good" man is and does and where the bounds of responsibility lie.

Historical moments referred to in the play are included:
January 1933 – Hitler took office
May 1933 – Book burning at the University of Berlin
January 1934 – Murder of SA Leader Ernst Röhm
November 1938 – Shooting of Ernst vom Rath
November 1938 – The night of the Broken Glass (the Anti-Jewish Pogroms)
June 1941 – Nazi War against the Soviet Union
June 1941 – Rudolf Höss ordered to establish extermination facilities at Auschwitz.

Productions
Good was originally commissioned by the Royal Shakespeare Company and premiered on 9 September 1981 at the Donmar Warehouse in Covent Garden, London. The play, directed by Howard Davies with Alan Howard in the role of Hadler and Joe Melia as Maurice, was subsequently seen all over the world, obtaining excellent reviews from critics and journalists, such as The New York Times.

In 1998, it secured joint 85th place in the Royal National Theatre's Survey of the "Most Significant Plays of the 20th Century". A year later, Michael Grandage directed in its original theatre a new successful play in two acts, with Charles Dance playing John Halder, Ian Gelder as Maurice, and Faith Brook as Halder's mother. The London Evening Standard described the event "one of the most powerful, politically pointed nights at the theatre."

The play has been largely performed by many theatre companies, including the Havant Arts Centre in 1986, the North Wall Arts Centre in 2008, the Hilberry Theater in 2010, the Royal Exchange Theatre, Everyman Theatre, Cardiff in 2011, and the Burning Coal Theatre Company in 2013.

A 12-week production, starring David Tennant, began at the Harold Pinter Theatre in London's West End in October 2022. The play was originally scheduled to play for 10 weeks at the Playhouse Theatre with previews beginning 6 October 2020. However, the production was rescheduled twice due to the COVID-19 pandemic.

Film adaptation
A film adaptation of the play, featuring Viggo Mortensen as John Halder and directed by Vicente Amorim, was released in December 2008.

Notes

References

1981 plays
Scottish plays
British plays adapted into films
Works about Nazism
Plays about the Holocaust